Alyse Gregory (July 19, 1884 Norwalk, Connecticut, United States – August 27, 1967 Morebath, Devon, England) was an American-British suffragist and writer.

Biography 
Gregory's father, James G. Gregory, was a doctor in Norwalk. She showed musical talent at an early age and was sent to Paris to receive a musical education when she was fifteen years old, and continued her study of music upon her return to the United States. She was invited by famous concert singer Katherine Tanner Fisk to return to Paris, live with her, and be trained as a professional singer. She remained in Paris with Mrs Fiske for a year.

She was drawn gradually into public movements because of her interest in social justice.  After returning to her home country, she decided to give up her singing ambitions.  She became involved in local politics and the woman suffrage movement for which she was a fearless public speaker. Gregory decided to start a grassroots women's suffrage club in Connecticut, as she explains in her autobiography The Day Is Gone (page 100). The first meeting brought together herself and five other women. Gregory went on to become a key leader in the Connecticut Woman Suffrage Association through which she directed activities such as meetings, plays, and parades alongside Cromwell native Emily Miller Pierson.  =She later (page 104, op. cit.) worked as assistant state organizer for the New Jersey Woman Suffrage Association during a referendum on woman suffrage in 1915 and was also active for the cause in the State of New York.

England 
After a visit to England during the First World War, she settled in Patchin Place in New York City, where she formed close friendships with a group of young artists and writers. She worked for two years as a copywriter in an advertising agency, which position she left in order to earn her living as a freelance writer.  She began contributing articles to such publications as The Freeman, The New Republic and The Dial, becoming Managing Editor of this last journal in February, 1924. Six months later, she married the English writer Llewelyn Powys, and in June 1925, resigned her position with The Dial to accompany her husband to England, where for five years they lived in a coastguard cottage on White Nothe, one of the wildest headlands of the Dorset coast.

Her first novel, She Shall Have Music was published in 1926, followed by King Log and Lady Lea (1929) and Hester Craddock (1931), both of which were written in Dorset.

She and her husband visited Palestine in 1928, and they spent the winter of 1930 in a house in the Berkshire Hills lent to them by Edna St. Vincent Millay and Eugen Boissevain. From there, they paid a visit to the West Indies. On their return to England, Llewelyn Powys suffered a relapse from an old illness, and in the winter of 1936, they went to Switzerland, where she wrote a book of essays, Wheels on Gravel (1938). In 1956, Alyse presented the author Rosemary Manning with a copy of Wheels on Gravel inscribed with a quotation from George Santayana: 'To understand oneself is the classic form of consolation, to elude oneself is the romantic'.

Death of Powys 
After Llewelyn Powys' death from tuberculosis in Switzerland in December 1939, Alyse went to live in a remote semi-detached house adjoining that occupied by Llewelyn's sisters, Gertrude and Philippa Powys, on Chaldon Down near East Chaldon, and wrote her autobiographical reminiscences, entitled The Day Is Gone, published in New York by E. P. Dutton (1948). She was a friend of many eminent people, including Florida Scott-Maxwell (who had been a pupil of Jung), Randolph Bourne, Van Wyck Brooks, Lewis Mumford, Amy Lowell, William Rose Benét and his brother Stephen Vincent Benét, Malcolm Elwin, Theodore Dreiser, Edna St. Vincent Millay, Marianne Moore and Sylvia Townsend Warner. She tended to remain in the shadow of her late husband (whose work and reputation she did much to promote), while continuing to contribute her own articles to a variety of journals up until the late 1950s.

In 1957, Alyse Gregory moved into Velthams Cottage, Morebath, Devon, as the tenant of Mrs Rosamund Mary Rose (née Rosamund Mary Trafford), at a rent of "one peppercorn a year (if demanded)". After the sudden death of her landlady on May 12, 1958, Velthams was bought at auction in 1960 by the writer Oliver Stonor, who had known Alyse previously; they were both present at local celebrations in East Chaldon on 7 or 8 May 1945, for the end of the Second World War in Europe, which took the form of a large bonfire near the Five Marys, a local group of prehistoric barrows. In her last years, many friends visited her, in spite of the rural isolation of Morebath, which had a railway station until 1966. Alyse had long been an advocate of voluntary euthanasia, and planned her own. She took a lethal overdose on 27 August 1967, and was cremated in Taunton, Somerset. Her last visitor on the day of her death was the author Rosemary Manning who described the visit in her autobiography A Corridor of Mirrors.

Legacy 
Excerpts from Gregory's diaries were published in 1973 under the title The Cry of a Gull.
 
In 1999, Alyse Gregory: A Woman at her Window by Jacqueline Peltier was published (London, Cecil Woolf).

The Sundial Press reissued Gregory's third novel, Hester Craddock, at the end of January 2007 with a new introduction by Barbara Ozieblo.

References

External links 

 Alyse Gregory Papers. Yale Collection of American Literature, Beinecke Rare Book and Manuscript Library.

1884 births
1967 deaths
20th-century American novelists
American expatriates in the United Kingdom
20th-century American memoirists
American political writers
American suffragists
American women novelists
Writers from Norwalk, Connecticut
American women memoirists
American women essayists
20th-century American women writers
Novelists from Connecticut
20th-century American essayists